Beijing to Boston is a split album featuring Boston ska punk act Big D and the Kids Table and China punk act Brain Failure. It was released on February 20, 2007, only a month before the release of the highly anticipated Strictly Rude.

Track listing 
 Songs performed by Brain Failure
 "Coming Down to Beijing" - 3:44
 "Living in the City" - 2:53
 "Time to Go" - 1:25
 "Fall in Love 2008" - 4:38
 "City Junk" - 2:15
 "You're Gonna Die" - 2:55

 Songs performed by Big D and the Kids Table
 "Faded" - 3:27
 "Taking Back the Rhythm" - 2:58
 "I'm Yours Boston" - 2:50
 "Running Young" - 1:13
 "Digging in Your Nails" - 2:16
 "Ruin You" - 4:50

Credits 
 Dicky Barrett - Vocals
 Ken Casey - Vocals, Producer
 Jon Cohan - Drum Technician
 Paul E. Cuttler - Trombone, Producer, Group Member
 Steve Foote - Bass, Producer, Group Member
 Raymond Jeffrey - Engineer
 Ma Jiliang - Bass, Background Vocals, Group Member
 Xu Lin - Drums, Background Vocals, Group Member
 Dave Locke - Mastering
 David McWane - Vocals, Producer, Art Direction, Group Member
 Jon "JR" Reilly - Drums
 Ryan O'Connor - Saxophone, Producer, Group Member
 Marc Orrell - Organ
 Sean P. Rogan - Guitar, Background Vocals, Melodica, Producer, Group Member
 Xiao Rong - Guitar, Vocals, Group Member
 Jim Siegel - Producer, Engineer, Mixing
 Dan Stoppelman - Trumpet, Producer, Group Member
 Matt Teuten - Photography

References 

2007 albums
Big D and the Kids Table albums